Angela Mellissa Griffin (born 19 July 1976) is a  British actress and television presenter who has been active on British television since the early 1990s. She is best known for portraying the roles of Fiona Middleton in the ITV soap opera Coronation Street (1992–1998, 2019), Kim Campbell in the BBC One school-based drama series Waterloo Road (2006–2007, 2009–2010, 2023–present), and DS Lizzie Maddox in the final two series of ITV's detective drama series Lewis (2014–2015). Griffin was also an original cast member of Holby City, playing nurse Jasmine Hopkins (1999–2001).

Early life
Griffin attended Intake High School in Leeds. She grew up on Cottingley Estate, near Beeston. She was born to an English mother and Caribbean father from St Kitts and Nevis.

Career
Between December 1992 and September 1998, Griffin appeared in the popular long-running ITV soap opera Coronation Street as hairdresser Fiona Middleton. She made a guest appearance in 2019. Griffin appeared in the ITV soap opera Emmerdale in 1993, playing a minor character called Tina. Subsequently, she joined the original cast of the BBC One medical drama series Holby City as staff nurse Jasmine Hopkins, but left at the end of the third series in 2001 as the next series would be longer. Griffin has also appeared in the BBC dramas Cutting It and Down to Earth.

In October 2001 Griffin presented Brown Britain, a programme on the UK's Channel 4 about mixed race people in British society. The show included interviews with a large number of well-known British mixed-race people such as Bruce Oldfield and Hanif Kureishi, as well as political figures such as Tony Benn.

From 2006 to 2010, she appeared as art teacher and head of pastoral care Kim Campbell opposite former Cutting It co-star Jason Merrells and former Coronation Street co-star Denise Welch in the BBC One school-based drama series Waterloo Road. She took a break during the third series in late 2007/early 2008, but returned to the role for the fourth series in 2009.  However, she left once again at the end of the fifth series to concentrate on her new daytime show on Sky1.

From November 2009 to July 2010, Griffin hosted her own live daytime show on Sky1 called Angela and Friends, a mix of health topics and celebrity gossip. She was joined by her best friends Lisa Faulkner and Nicola Stephenson. In 1999, she presented The Midweek National Lottery and also took part in the BBC's millennium programme on New Year's Eve. She filmed a pilot for the show Dishes on Channel 4, but decided against presenting it once it had been commissioned and was replaced by Kate Thornton.

Griffin also provides the voice of Amy, the vet in children's television show Postman Pat.

In March 2008, Griffin appeared on the daytime reality show Murder Most Famous, where, with five other celebrities, she wrote a crime novel, coached by crime writer Minette Walters, the end prize being, having the winning celebrities' novel published. It was won by former Coronation Street co-star Sherrie Hewson.

In January 2010, Griffin and Gethin Jones co-presented Sky 1's coverage of the Golden Globes. Griffin appeared in the first two series of Sky TV comedy drama Mount Pleasant and presented Emergency with Angela Griffin on Sky1. In January 2012, she appeared in the BBC Two show The Great Sport Relief Bake Off and was one of three finalists.

In 2013, Griffin played Dolly in One Man, Two Guvnors. In 2014 and 2015, Griffin starred as DS Lizzie Maddox in the ITV series Lewis. From 5–9 January 2015, Griffin and Kian Egan co-hosted Fat Pets: Slimmer of the Year for ITV. 

Griffin had a recurring role as Elizabeth Harvey in the third series of Harlots. On 17 September 2018, Griffin co-presented The One Show on BBC One alongside Matt Baker.

In October 2018, Griffin began playing detective Stevie Hall in the Canadian drama The Detail.

Griffin hosted BBC Radio 2's Unwinds, starting in August 2021. From September 2021, Griffin also started sitting in for Steve Wright on Sunday Love Songs on various occasions on the station.

In January 2022, it was announced that Griffin would once again reprise her role as Kim Campbell for a new series of Waterloo Road, with her character now promoted to Head Teacher.
In April 2022, Griffin starred in the Netflix Horror film Choose or Die, playing the main protagonist's mother Thea.

Filmography

References

External links
 
 Radio 2 Unwinds with Angela Griffin (BBC Radio 2)

1976 births
Living people
Actresses from Leeds
BBC Radio 2 presenters
Black British actresses
English television actresses
English soap opera actresses
English television presenters
English people of Saint Kitts and Nevis descent